The 2021–22 New Orleans Privateers men's basketball team represents the University of New Orleans during the 2021–22 NCAA Division I men's basketball season. The Privateers are led by eleventh-year head coach Mark Slessinger and play their home games at Lakefront Arena as members of the Southland Conference.

Previous season
The Privateers finished the 2020–21 season 10–14, 8–7 in Southland play to finish in sixth place. In the Southland tournament, they defeated Southeastern Louisiana in the second round, before falling to Northwestern State in the quarterfinals.

Roster

Schedule and results

|-
!colspan=9 style=|Exhibition

|-
!colspan=9 style=|Non-conference regular season

|-
!colspan=9 style=|Southland Regular Season

|-
!colspan=9 style=| Southland tournament

|-
!colspan=12 style=| The Basketball Classic

Source:

References

New Orleans Privateers men's basketball seasons
New Orleans
New Orleans Privateers men's basketball
New Orleans Privateers men's basketball
New Orleans